Hanoi Vocational Education and Training Company (HAVETCO) is an international & educational institution specialized in language, education and career services. The company, licensed under the Vietnamese Ministry of Education, has its main office in Hanoi, Vietnam and is a member of Vietnamese Vocational Training Association (VVTA).

History
HAVETCO was established in Hanoi in 1995, as an education consultancy company specialized in sending students abroad. In 2003, a Language Training Centre was set up offering a variety of English, French, Chinese, Japanese and Russian language courses.

Philosophy
HAVETCO aims to provide Vietnamese students outstanding language skills and access to top international academic institutions.

See also
 Education in Vietnam
 List of universities in Vietnam
 Vocational schools of the Ministry of Industry
 Hanoi
 Vietnam

External links
HAVETCO Education - Training - Career Services
Ministry of Education and Training
National Institute for Education Strategy and Curriculum Development at Ministry site
Education Publishing House and list of subsidiaries, at Ministry site
Educational institutions established in 1995
1995 establishments in Vietnam